Class struggle refers to conflict of interests between socioeconomic classes. It may also refer to:

 Class Struggle (board game), a board game for two to six players, designed by Bertell Ollman
 The Class Struggle (Erfurt Program) Official SPD Commentary on the Erfurt Program, Karl Kautsky, 1892
 The Class Struggle (magazine), an American left socialist magazine 1917–1919
The Class Struggle, journal of the Communist League of Struggle 1931-1937
Class Struggle, the newspaper of the American Trotskyist group Spark
 "Scenes from the Class Struggle in Springfield", an episode of The Simpsons
 Klassekampen (English: The Class Struggle), a Norwegian daily newspaper

See also
 Class war (disambiguation)